The Limerick to Foynes Railway is a  mothballed line in County Limerick, Ireland that connected the city of Limerick with the port of Foynes. A tender was published, for the works to reopen the line, in mid-2022. These works, starting with the clearing of vegetation, had begun by late 2022.

History 
The railway was opened in April 1858 by the Limerick and Foynes Railway, which was taken over by the Waterford and Limerick Railway in 1873. Initially there was no direct access to the line from Limerick station, with the line branching off at Limerick Check signal cabin. As part of the Cork and Limerick Direct Railway, operated by the Great Southern and Western Railway, a direct line was built in 1862. Construction of a  branch to the cement factory at Castlemungret begun in September 1956, with the line opening on 1 October 1957. No passengers were carried on the Castlemungret branch, and the line to Foynes closed to passengers on 2 February 1963. Goods trains continued to run, and increased traffic to Castlemungret resulted in a second track being built between Limerick Check and the junction to the factory. The direct curve into Limerick Colbert was closed and lifted in September 1975, while ground frames connecting the Castlemungret and Foynes lines were removed in the 1980s, leaving the lines operationally separate. Goods trains to Foynes ceased in November 2000, and in May 2002 the last train, a weed sprayer, moved on the line. The line was disconnected from the broader Irish Rail network at Limerick Check in November 2007. Goods trains to Castlemungret continued until 2009, with the branch finally being disconnected in 2013.

Proposed reopening 
Since the line's closure in 2000, a number of proposals were made to reopen the line. In December 2018, Irish Rail sought permission to replace the unsafe Robertstown viaduct for the potential reintroduction of freight traffic with a new, single-span structure. The railway line is part of the EU Trans-European Transport Network (TEN-T) infrastructure, and in 2015 the Shannon Foynes Port Company received €800,000 to study the feasibility of reinstating the line.

In July 2022, Irish Rail published a tender to contract for the rebuilding of the line. These works had reportedly commenced by mid-November 2022. In early 2023, it was announced that the tender contract had been agreed, with works on reopening the line due to commence in February 2023.

References

Closed railways in Ireland
Transport in County Limerick